Proto-Austronesian (commonly abbreviated as PAN or PAn) is a proto-language. It is the reconstructed ancestor of the Austronesian languages, one of the world's major language families. Proto-Austronesian is assumed to have begun to diversify  3,500–4,000 BCE on Taiwan.

Lower-level reconstructions have also been made, and include Proto-Malayo-Polynesian, Proto-Oceanic, and Proto-Polynesian. Recently, linguists such as Malcolm Ross and Andrew Pawley have built large lexicons for Proto-Oceanic and Proto-Polynesian.

Phonology
Proto-Austronesian is reconstructed by constructing sets of correspondences among consonants in the various Austronesian languages, according to the comparative method.  Although in theory the result should be unambiguous, in practice given the large number of languages there are numerous disagreements, with various scholars differing significantly on the number and nature of the phonemes in Proto-Austronesian.  In the past, some disagreements concerned whether certain correspondence sets were real or represent sporadic developments in particular languages.  For the currently remaining disagreements, however, scholars generally accept the validity of the correspondence sets but disagree on the extent to which the distinctions in these sets can be projected back to proto-Austronesian or represent innovations in particular sets of daughter languages.

Blust's reconstruction
Below are Proto-Austronesian phonemes reconstructed by Robert Blust, a professor of linguistics at the University of Hawaii at Manoa. A total of 25 Proto-Austronesian consonants, 4 vowels, and 4 diphthongs were reconstructed. However, Blust acknowledges that some of the reconstructed consonants are still controversial and debated.

The symbols below are frequently used in reconstructed Proto-Austronesian words.

 *C: voiceless alveolar affricate
 *c: voiceless palatal affricate
 *q: uvular
 *z: voiced palatal affricate
 *D: voiced retroflex stop
 *j: palatalized voiced velar stop
 *S: voiceless alveolar fricative
 *N: palatalized alveolar lateral
 *r: alveolar trill
 *R: uvular trill

*D only appears in final position, *z/*c/*ñ only in initial and medial position, while *j is restricted to medial and final position.

The Proto-Austronesian vowels are a, i, u, and ə.

The diphthongs, which are diachronic sources of individual vowels, are:
 *-ay
 *-aw
 *-uy
 *-iw

Wolff's reconstruction
In 2010, John Wolff published his Proto-Austronesian reconstruction in Proto-Austronesian phonology with glossary. Wolff reconstructs a total of 19 consonants, 4 vowels (*i, *u, *a, *e, where *e = ), 4 diphthongs (*ay, *aw, *iw, *uy), and syllabic stress.

The following table shows how Wolff's Proto-Austronesian phonemic system differs from Blust's system.

Historical overview of reconstructions for Proto-Austronesian

According to Malcolm Ross, the following aspects of Blust's system are uncontroversial: the labials (p b m w); the velars k ŋ; y; R; the vowels; and the above four diphthongs.  There is some disagreement about the postvelars (q ʔ h) and the velars g j, and about whether there are any more diphthongs; however, in these respects, Ross and Blust are in agreement. The major disagreement concerns the system of coronal consonants.  The following discussion is based on Ross (1992).

Otto Dempwolff's reconstruction of Proto-Malayo-Polynesian from the 1930s included:
Dental t d n l
Retroflex ṭ ḍ ḷ
Palatal t' d' n'
Palatal k' g'

Dyen (1963), including data from the Formosan languages, expanded Dempwolff's set of coronal consonants: 
t split into t and C
n split into n and L/N
d' split and renotated as z and Z
t' split into s1 and s2
ḷ ṭ ḍ n' k' g' h renotated as r T D ñ c j q

Tsuchida (1976), building on Dyen's system:
Further split d into D1 D2 D3 D4. He also believed that Dyen's c (Dempwolff's k') could not be reconstructed for Proto-Austronesian (he also split Dyen's w into w W and q into q Q, which were not accepted by later scholars.)

Dahl reduced Tsuchida's consonants into:
D1 D2 D3 D4 into d3 d2 d1 d3 (with the new d3 reflecting the combination of the old D1 and D4) and combined Dyen's S X x into a single phoneme S.  He did accept Dyen's c but did not accept his T D. (He also renotated a number of phonemes in ways that were not generally accepted by later scholars.)

Blust based his system on a combination of Dyen, Tsuchida and Dahl, and attempted to reduce the total number of phonemes. He accepted Dahl's reduction of Dyen's S X x into S but did not accept either Tsuchida's or Dahl's split of Dyen's d; in addition, he reduced Dyen's s1 s2 to a single phoneme s. While accepting Dyen's c, he was hesitant about T and D (more recently, Blust appears to have accepted D but rejected T, and also rejected Z).

Ross likewise attempted to reduce the number of phonemes, but in a different way:
He accepts Dahl's d1 d2 d3 and also Z (eventually rejected by Blust).  He notes that the distinction between d1 and d2 d3 is only reconstructable for the Formosan language groups Amis, Proto-Puyuma and Proto-Paiwan, and only Proto-Paiwan has a three-way distinction among d1 d2 d3; contrarily the distinction between Z and d1 is reconstructable only for Proto-Rukai and Proto-Malayo-Polynesian, but not any of the previous three groups.  However, he still believes (contra Blust) that the distinction among these phonemes is an inheritance from Proto-Austronesian rather than an innovation in the respective groups.
He notes that d1 occurs only morpheme-initially, while r occurs only morpheme-non-initially, and as a result combines the two.
He does not accept the phonemes c z ñ in Proto-Austronesian, and asserts that none of them are "readily reconstructable" outside of Proto-Malayo-Polynesian. Furthermore, while he believes that ñ was a general innovation in Proto-Malayo-Polynesian, c and z "are reflected differently from PMP [Proto-Malayo-Polynesian] *s and *d only in a fairly limited area of western Indo-Malaysia and appear to be the results of local developments".
He also reconstructs the coronals somewhat differently. He believes that C S l d3 were all retroflex (respectively), and s and L (Blust's N) were dental /s/ and /l/, as opposed to Blust's reconstruction as dental and palatal, respectively. According to Ross, this is based on their outcomes in the Formosan languages and Javanese; although their outcomes as dental/palatal is geographically more distributed, it occurs only in Malayo-Polynesian, which represent a single clade with respect to the Formosan languages.

Sound changes

As Proto-Austronesian transitioned to Proto-Malayo-Polynesian, Proto-Oceanic, and Proto-Polynesian, the phonemic inventories were continually reduced by merging formerly distinct sounds into one sound. Three mergers were observed in the Proto-Austronesian to Proto-Malayo-Polynesian transition, while nine were observed for the Proto-Oceanic to Proto-Polynesian transition. Thus, Proto-Austronesian has the most elaborate sound system, while Proto-Polynesian has the fewest phonemes. For instance, the Hawaiian language is famous for having only eight consonants, while Māori has only ten consonants. This is a sharp reduction from the 19–25 consonants of the Proto-Austronesian language that was originally spoken on Taiwan or Kinmen.

Blust also observed the following mergers and sound changes between Proto-Austronesian and Proto-Malayo-Polynesian.

However, according to Wolff (2010:241), Proto-Malayo-Polynesian's development from Proto-Austronesian only included the following three sound changes.

 PAn *ɬ > PMP *ñ, l, n
 PAn *s > PMP *h
 PAn *h > PMP *Ø

Proto-Oceanic merged even more phonemes. This is why modern-day Polynesian languages have some of the most restricted consonant inventories in the world.

Unusual sound changes that occurred within the Austronesian language family include:
 Proto-Malayo-Polynesian *w or *b > Sundanese c- or -nc-
 Proto-Oceanic *w or *y > p in Levei Khehek
 Proto-Oceanic *r or *R > g​͡ʟ in Hiw
 Proto-Polynesian *l or *r > ŋg (via *ɣ or *ʁ) in Rennellese
 Proto-Polynesian *t > k in Hawaiian, Samoan, and Ontong Java (after *k > ʔ)

Syntax

Word order
Proto-Austronesian is a verb-initial language (including VSO and VOS word orders), as most Formosan languages, all Philippine languages, some Bornean languages, all Austronesian dialects of Madagascar, and all Polynesian languages are verb-initial. However, most Austronesian (many of which are Oceanic) languages of Indonesia, New Guinea, New Caledonia, Vanuatu, the Solomon Islands, and Micronesia are SVO, or verb-medial, languages. SOV, or verb-final, word order is considered to be typologically unusual for Austronesian languages, and is only found in various Austronesian languages of New Guinea and to a more limited extent, the Solomon Islands. This is because SOV word order is very common in the non-Austronesian Papuan languages.

Voice system
The Austronesian languages of Taiwan, Borneo, Madagascar and the Philippines are also well known for their unusual morphosyntactic alignment, which is known as the symmetrical voice (also known as the Austronesian alignment). This alignment was also present in the Proto-Austronesian language. Unlike Proto-Austronesian, however, Proto-Oceanic syntax does not make use of the focus morphology present in Austronesian-aligned languages such as the Philippine languages. In the Polynesian languages, verbal morphology is relatively simple, while the main unit in a sentence is the phrase rather than the word.

Below is a table of John Wolff's Proto-Austronesian voice system from Blust (2009:433). Wolff's "four-voice" system was derived from evidence in various Formosan and Philippine languages.

However, Ross (2009) notes that what may be the most divergent languages, Tsou, Rukai, and Puyuma, are not addressed by this reconstruction, which therefore cannot claim to be alignment system of the protolanguage of the entire family. He calls the unit to which this reconstruction applies Nuclear Austronesian.

Interrogatives and case markers
The following table compares Proto-Austronesian and Proto-Malayo-Polynesian question words.

Currently, the most complete reconstruction of the Proto-Austronesian case marker system is offered by Malcolm Ross. The reconstructed case markers are as follows:

Important Proto-Austronesian grammatical words include the ligature *na and locative *i.

Morphology
Morphology and syntax are often hard to separate in the Austronesian languages, particularly the Philippine languages. This is because the morphology of the verbs often affects how the rest of the sentence would be constructed (i.e., syntax).

Affixes
Below are some Proto-Austronesian affixes (including prefixes, infixes, and suffixes) reconstructed by Robert Blust. For instance, *pa- was used for non-stative (i.e., dynamic) causatives, while *pa-ka was used for stative causatives (Blust 2009:282). Blust also noted a p/m pairing phenomenon in which many affixes have both p- and m- forms. This system is especially elaborate in the Thao language of Taiwan.

Reduplication
CV (consonant + vowel) reduplication is very common among the Austronesian languages. In Proto-Austronesian, Ca-reduplicated (consonant + /a/) numbers were used to count humans, while the non-reduplicated sets were used to count non-human and inanimate objects. CV-reduplication was also used to nominalize verbs in Proto-Austronesian. In Ilocano, CV-reduplication is used to pluralize nouns.

Reduplication patterns include (Blust 2009):

Full reduplication
Full reduplication plus affixation
Full reduplication minus the coda
Full reduplication minus the last vowel
Full reduplication with vocalic or consonantal change, or both
Full reduplication with consecutive identical syllables
Prefixal foot reduplication/leftward reduplication
Suffixal foot reduplication/rightward reduplication
CVC-reduplication
CV-reduplication (marks durative aspect, collectivity, or intensity in Bunun; future in Tagalog)
CV-reduplication plus affixation
Ca-reduplication (used to derive human-counting numerals and deverbal instrumental nouns in Thao and Puyuma)
Extensions of fixed segmentism
Reduplicative infixes
Suffixal syllable reduplication

Other less common patterns are (Blust 2009):
Vacuous reduplication (occurs in Paamese)
Full reduplication minus the initial (occurs in Anejom of southern Vanuatu)
Full reduplication plus an initial glide (occurs in Kosraean)
Partial reduplication minus initial glottal stop (occurs in Rennellese)
True CV-reduplication (occurs in Pangasinan)
Rightward trisyllabic reduplication (occurs in the Manam language)
Double reduplication (occurs in Woleaian)
Triplication (only in the Thao language)
Serial reduplication (only in the Thao language)

Vocabulary

Pronouns

The Proto-Austronesian and Proto-Malayo-Polynesian personal pronouns below were reconstructed by Robert Blust.

In 2006, Malcolm Ross also proposed seven different pronominal categories for persons. The categories are listed below, with the Proto-Austronesian first person singular ("I") given as examples.
Neutral (e.g., PAN *i-aku)
Nominative 1 (e.g., PAN *aku)
Nominative 2 (e.g., PAN *=ku, *[S]aku)
Accusative (e.g., PAN *i-ak-ən)
Genitive 1 (e.g., PAN *=[a]ku)
Genitive 2 (e.g., PAN *(=)m-aku)
Genitive 3 (e.g., PAN *n-aku)

The following is from Ross' 2002 proposal of the Proto-Austronesian pronominal system, which contains five categories, including the free (i.e., independent or unattached), free polite, and three genitive categories.

Nouns
Proto-Austronesian vocabulary relating to agriculture and other technological innovations include:
 *pajay: rice plant
 *beRas: husked rice
 *Semay: cooked rice
 *qayam: bird (means "domesticated animal" in PMP)
 *manuk: chicken (PMP *manu-manuk means "bird")
 *babuy: pig
 *qaNuaŋ: carabao
 *kuden: clay cooking pot
 *SadiRi: housepost
 *busuR: bow
 *panaq: flight of an arrow
 *bubu: fish trap
 *tulaNi: bamboo nose flute

Proto-Malayo-Polynesian innovations include:
 *puqun: base of a tree; origin, cause
 *sumpit: blowpipe
 *haRezan: notched log ladder (used to enter pile dwellings)
 *taytay: bamboo suspension bridge (POc *tete "ladder, bridge")
 *kaka: elder same sex sibling
 *huaji: younger same sex sibling
 *ñaRa: brother of a woman
 *betaw: sister of a man

Proto-Malayo-Polynesian also has several words for house:
 *balay (house, building for public use)
 *Rumaq (house, family dwelling)
 *lepaw (granary)
 *kamaliR (bachelors' clubhouse)

Animals

Plants

Colors and directions
Below are colors in reconstructed Proto-Austronesian, Proto-Malayo-Polynesian, Proto-Oceanic, and Proto-Polynesian. The first three have been reconstructed by Robert Blust, while the Proto-Polynesian words given below were reconstructed by Andrew Pawley. Proto-Polynesian displays many innovations not found in the other proto-languages.

The Proto-Austronesians used two types of directions, which are the land-sea axis and the monsoon axis. The cardinal directions of north, south, east, and west developed among the Austronesian languages only after contact with the Europeans. For the land-sea axis, upstream/uphill and inland, as well as downstream/downhill and seaward, are synonym pairs. This has been proposed as evidence that Proto-Austronesians used to live on a mainland, since the sea would be visible from all angles on small islands.

 *daya: inland (also upstream/uphill)
 *lahud: seaward (also downstream/downhill)
 *SabaRat: west monsoon
 *timuR: east monsoon
 *qamiS: north wind

In Kavalan, Amis, and Tagalog, the reflexes of *timuR mean "south" or "south wind," while in the languages of the southern Philippines and Indonesia it means "east" or "east wind."

In Ilocano,  and  respectively mean "east" and "west," while in Puyuma,  and  respectively mean "west" and "east." This is because the Ilocano homeland is the west coast of northern Luzon, while the Puyuma homeland is on the eastern coast of southern Taiwan. Among the Bontok, Kankanaey, and Ifugaw languages of northern Luzon, the reflexes of *daya mean "sky" because they already live in some of the highest elevations in the Philippines (Blust 2009:301).

Numerals
Below are reconstructed Proto-Austronesian, Proto-Malayo-Polynesian, Proto-Oceanic, and Proto-Polynesian numbers from the Austronesian Basic Vocabulary Database.

Note that *lima 'five', ultimately the root for 'hand', is not found for 'five' in some Formosan languages, such as Pazeh, Saisiat, Luilang, Favorlang and Taokas; numerals cognate with Proto-Malayo-Polynesian 6–10 are found in Amis, Basay, Bunun, Kanakanabu, Kavalan, Paiwan, Puyuma, Saaroa and Tsou. Pazeh, Favorlang,  Saisiat and Taokas reflect *RaCep 'five'.

Laurent Sagart suggests that this was the PAn root, replaced by *lima in a lineage that lead to the remaining languages, rather than the reverse, because it seems to be retained in proto-Malayo-Polynesian in the forms 7, 8, 9, which appear to be disyllabic contractions of additive phrases attested from some of the western Formosan languages, especially Pazeh: Pazeh xaseb-uza 'six' (literally 'five-one'); xaseb-i-dusa 'seven' ('five-and-two'), with the bidu cognate with PMP *pitu; xaseb-a-turu 'eight' ('five-and-three'), with the baturu cognate with PMP *walu; xaseb-i-supat 'nine' ('five-and-four'), with the supa (< PAn *Sepat 'four') cognate with PMP *Siwa.

The Proto-Austronesian language had different sets of numerals for non-humans ("set A") and humans ("set B") (Blust 2009:279). Cardinal numerals for counting humans are derived from the non-human numerals through Ca-reduplication. In many Philippine languages such as Tagalog, the two numeral systems are merged (Blust 2009:280-281).

Proto-Austronesian also used *Sika- to derive ordinal numerals (Blust 2009:281).

Verbs
Below are reconstructed Proto-Austronesian, Proto-Malayo-Polynesian, Proto-Oceanic, and Proto-Polynesian verbs from the Austronesian Basic Vocabulary Database.

Monosyllabic roots
The following are monosyllabic Proto-Austronesian roots reconstructed by John Wolff (Wolff 1999).

Forms which can be reconstructed as monosyllables with a great deal of certainty
 *baw 'up, above'
 *bay 'woman'
 *beg 'spool, wind'
 *bit 'carry in fingers'
 *buñ 'fontanelle'
 *but 'pluck out'
 *dem 'think, brood'
 *gem 'first, hold in fist'
 *ɣiq 'Imperata cylindrica'
 *kan 'eat'
 *si-kan 'fish, what is eaten with staple'
 *pa-kan 'feed, weft'
 *paN-kan 'eat, feed'
 *kub
 *kubkub 'cover over'
 *takub 'cover over in a cupped way' (where *ta- is a fossilized prefix)
 *lid
 *belit 'wind'
 * 'wind, twist, or fold s.t. over'
 *pulid 'turn round'
 *luk 'concave bend'
 *lum 'ripe'
 *nem 'six'
 *ñam 'taste'
 *ñeŋ 'look, stare'
 *ŋa 'agape (mouth)'
 *kaŋa 'be open (as mouth)'
 *baŋa 'gap, stand open'
 *binaŋa (< -in- + baŋa) / *minaŋa 'mouth of river'
 *beŋa 'be agape'
 *búŋa 'flower'
 *paŋa 'forking'
 *ʃaŋa 'branch'
 *pan 'bait'
 *pat 'four'
 *peʃ 'squeeze, deflate'
 *pit
 *kepit 'pinched together'
 *pu 'grandparent/child'
 *put 'blow'
 *ʃaw 'wash, rinse off, dunk'
 *ʃay 'who?'
 *ʃek 'stuff, fill chock full'
 *ʃeŋ 'stop up'
 *ʃep 'suck'
 *ʃuk 'go in, through'
 *taw 'man'
 *tay 'bridge'
 *matay 'die'
 *patay 'dead, kill'
 *tuk 'strike, peck, beak'

Sequences which are likely (or may have been) monosyllabic roots, but cannot be unequivocally reconstructed
 *baŋ 'fly'
 *bu 'fish trap'
 *buʃ 'puff, blow out' (not well attested; most monosyllables occur in Oceanic languages)
 *dañ 'old (of things)'
 *daŋ 'heat near a fire'
 *dem 'dark, cloudy'
 *padem 'extinguish'
 *diʃ 'cut, lance'
 *ka 'elder sibling'
 *kid 'file, rasp'
 *lag 'spread out'
 *belag 'spread out'
 *pálag 'palm of hand'
 *qelag 'wing'
 *laŋ 'placed lengthwise'
 *galaŋ 'wedge, s.t. placed underneath to support'
 *halaŋ 'lie athwart, bar, be an obstacle'
 *leb 'for water to come over s.t.'
 *lem – reflexes variously mean 'night' or 'darkness'
 *luñ
 *luluñ 'roll up'
 *baluñ 'fold over, wrap'
 *muɣuɣ 'gargle, rinse out mouth' (monosyllabic status is weak)
 *pak 'make a sound of 'pak', wings (from the sound)'
 *tan 'set trap'
 *taʃ 'top'
 *tuk 'top, summit'
 *tun 'lead on a rope'

Reconstructed doubled monosyllables phonologically but which cannot be proven to be monosyllabic roots
 *baba 'carry on back'
 *bakbak 'remove outer layer of skin, bark'
 *baqbaq 'mouth'
 *bañbañ 'kind of reed used for mats, Donax canniformis'
 *bekbek 'pulverize'
 *biɣbiɣ 'lips (lip-like growth)'
 *biŋbiŋ 'hold, guide'
 *biʃbiʃ 'sprinkle'
 *buɣ(buɣ) 'broken into small pieces'
 *buñbuñ 'down, body hair' (only in Taiwan and the Philippines; probably not PAn)
 *dabdab 'set fire to'
 *dakdak 'slam s.t. down' (only in the Philippines)
 *dasdas 'chest'
 *debdeb 'chest'
 *diŋdiŋ 'wall'
 *diqdiq 'boil'
 *gapgap 'feel, grope'
 *ɣaʃɣaʃ 'scratched'
 *idid 'move rapidly in small motions' (e.g., 'fan')
 *jutjut 'pull at'
 *kaŋkaŋ 'spread the legs' (only in the Philippines and western Indonesia)
 *bakaŋ 'bow-legged'
 *kaqkaq 'split, torn, with intestines'
 *keŋkeŋ 'rigid, tight'
 *kepkep 'clasp'
 *dakep 'catch'
 *ʃikep 'catch s.t. moving, tight'
 *kiskis 'scrape off'
 *kiʃkiʃ 'grate, file'
 *kudkud 'grate, rasp, scratch out'
 *kañuskus 'fingernail'
 *kuʃkuʃ 'rub, scrape'
 *laplap 'flapping, loose (like skin on newborn)' (only in Paiwan and Philippine languages)
 *mekmek 'fragments'
 *neknek 'gnat, fruit fly'
 *nemnem 'think'
 *palaqpaq 'frond'
 *pejpej 'press together'
 *ququ 'crab'
 *sapsap 'grope'
 *ʃaʃa 'collect palm leaves for thatching'
 *ʃakʃak 'beat, chop'
 *ʃelʃel 'regret'
 *ʃelʃel 'insert, cram in'
 *ʃiʃi 'kind of mollusk'
 *ʃikʃik 'search through thoroughly (as for lice)'
 *ʃuʃu 'breast, teat'
 *ʃuɣʃuɣ 'follow behind'
 *ʃuŋʃuŋ 'go against' (only in the Philippines and western Indonesia)
 *taktak 'fall, drop'
 *tamtam 'smack lips' or taste'
 *taʃtaʃ 'rent, break thread'
 *bútaʃ 'hole'
 *ɣetaʃ 'break through, break open'
 *teʃteʃ 'rip open'
 *tutu 'strike'
 *waqwaq 'channel'
 *witwit 'swinging to and fro'

Sequences which occur as final syllables over a wide area but which cannot be reconstructed as a monosyllabic root
 *buk
 *dabuk 'ashes'
 *dábuk 'beat to pulp'
 *ɣabuk 'pulverized'
 *qabuk 'dust'
 *bun 'dew mist'
 *bun 'heap, stack'
 *subun 'heap, pile'
 *timbun / *tábun (?) 'heap'
 *ɣábun 'fog'
 *buq 'add, increase'
 *tubuq 'grow, shoot'
 *duŋ 'protect, shelter'
 *ket
 *deket 'near'
 *jeket 'stick'
 *ñiket / ñaŋket 'sticky'
 *ñiket 'sticky substance'
 *siket 'tie'
 *kuŋ
 *bekuŋ 'arch'
 *dekuŋ 'bent'
 *leŋkuŋ 'bent'
 *kup
 *aŋkup 'put in cupped hands'
 *tukup 'cover'
 *kut
 *dakut 'take in hand'
 *ɣakut 'tie together'
 *ʃaŋkut 'caught on a hook'
 *laq
 *telaq / *kelaq 'crack' or 'split'
 *belaq 'cleft'
 *liŋ
 *baliŋ 'wind around, turn s.t. around'
 *biliŋ 'turning round'
 *giliŋ 'roll over s.t.'
 *guliŋ 'roll up'
 *paliŋ 'wind around' or 'turn body'
 *liw
 *baliw 'return, go back'
 *ʃaliw 'give in exchange'
 *luʃ 'slip' or 'slippery' or 'smooth'
 *naw
 *línaw 'calm, unroiled'
 *tiqenaw 'clear'
 *ŋaw
 *baŋaw 'bedbug'
 *láŋaw 'fly'
 *tuŋaw 'kind of mite causing itch'
 *ŋet
 *qaŋet 'warm'
 *ʃeŋet 'sharp, stinger'
 *ʃeŋet 'acrid in smell'
 *paɣ 'be flat'
 *dampaɣ / *lampaɣ / *dapaɣ / *lapaɣ 'be flat'
 *sampaɣ 'mat, spread out'
 *puŋ 'cluster, bunch'
 *taɣ
 *dataɣ 'flat area'

See also
 Austronesian personal pronouns
 Austronesian alignment
 Fossilized affixes in Austronesian languages
 Proto-Malayo-Polynesian language
 Proto-Philippine language
 Proto-Oceanic language
 Proto-Polynesian language
 Proto-Austroasiatic language
 Proto-Hmong–Mien language
 Proto-Tibeto-Burman language
 Wiktionary:Appendix:Cognate sets for Austronesian languages

References

Sources

Adelaar, A. (2005). The Austronesian languages of Asia and Madagascar: A historical perspective. In A. Adelaar, & N. P. Himmelmann (Eds.), The Austronesian Languages of Asia and Madagascar. New York: Routledge.
Bouchard-Côtéa, A., Hallb, D., Griffithsc, T. L., & Kleinb, D. (2012). Automated reconstruction of ancient languages using probabilistic models of sound change , PNAS, December 22, 2012.
 Blust, R. (1999). Subgrouping, circularity and extinction: Some issues in Austronesian comparative linguistics. In Zeitoun, E., & Li, P. J-K. (Eds.), Selected Papers From the 8th International Conference on Austronesian Linguistics. Taipei: Academica Sinica. https://web.archive.org/web/20170409095340/http://language.psy.auckland.ac.nz/austronesian/language.php?id=280
 Blust, R. A. (2009). The Austronesian Languages. Canberra: Pacific Linguistics, Research School of Pacific and Asian Studies, Australian National University. .
 Cohen, E. M. K. (1999). Fundaments of Austronesian Roots and Etymology. Canberra: Pacific Linguistics, Research School of Pacific and Asian Studies, Australian National University.
 Greenhill, S. J., Blust. R, & Gray, R. D. (2008). The Austronesian Basic Vocabulary Database: From Bioinformatics to Lexomics. Evolutionary Bioinformatics, 4:271-283. https://web.archive.org/web/20170503020518/http://language.psy.auckland.ac.nz/austronesian/
 Wolff, John U. (2010). Proto-Austronesian Phonology with Glossary. Ithaca, NY: Cornell Southeast Asia Program Publications.

Further reading

 Blust, Robert and Stephen Trussel. 2018. Austronesian Comparative Dictionary, web edition.
 Dahl, Otto Christian. 1976. Proto-Austronesian (2nd, revised edition). Scandinavian Institute of Asian Studies Monograph Series, No. 15. London: Curzon Press.
 Dahl, Otto Christian. 1981. Early phonetic and phonemic changes in Austronesian. Oslo: Instituttet for Sammenlignende Kulturforskning.

External links

 Blust, Robert and Trussel, Stephen (work-in-progress), Austronesian Comparative Dictionary (ACD)
 ABVD: Proto-Austronesian (Blust)
 ABVD: Proto-Austronesian (Zorc)
 ABVD: Proto-Malayo-Polynesian (Blust)
 ABVD: Proto-Malayo-Polynesian (Zorc)
 ABVD: Proto-Central Eastern Malayo Polynesian (Blust)
 ABVD: Proto-Central Malayo Polynesian (Blust)
 ABVD: Proto-Oceanic (Blust)
 ABVD: Proto-Oceanic (Pawley)
 ABVD: Proto-Micronesian (Bender)
 ABVD: Proto-Polynesian (Pawley)
Fire Mountain Presents-A Comparison of Austronesian Languages-Foreword

Austronesian languages
Austronesian